Moscow Criminal Investigations Department or just MUR (Russian: Московский уголовный розыск, МУР) — is a detective branch within Moscow City Police which established as Moscow Criminal Detective Department (Московский уголовный сыск, МУС) on 1866.

The Criminal Investigation Department of the Directorate of the Ministry of Internal Affairs of Russia for the city of Moscow is located at the address: 127994, Russia, Moscow, Petrovka Street, Building 38 (see the building of the Directorate of the Ministry of Internal Affairs of Russia for Moscow).

The head of the Criminal Investigation Department of the Main Directorate of the Ministry of Internal Affairs of Russia for the city of Moscow - from February 2018, Major General of Police Kuzmin, Sergey Nikolaevich.

History
The Moscow CID's roots are from the Moscow detective prikaz (Russian: Сыскной приказ) of the Grand Duchy of Moscow, which was established in 1619, replacing by the interrogation mission (Russian: Розыскная экспедиция) established in 1763. In 1782 the Bureau of Criminal Affairs (Палата уголовных дел) was established and it was the Moscow department of the Russian gendarmerie and on 1866 it was renamed to Moscow Criminal Investigations/Detective Department.

Recruitment
The officers in the Criminal Investigation Department are required to have had at least two years as a uniformed officer before applying to transfer to the department and receive further training when they do so.
Muscovite CID officers are involved in investigation of major crimes such as rape, murder, serious assault, fraud, and any other offences that require complex detection. They are responsible for acting upon intelligence received and then building a case.

See also 
The Meeting Place Cannot Be Changed

References

External links
Official website (In Russian)

Moscow City Police
Organizations based in Moscow
Government agencies established in 1866
Criminal investigation
1866 establishments in the Russian Empire